Skydive Houston Airport  is a privately owned, private airport located in unincorporated Waller County, Texas, United States. It is four nautical miles (7 km) south of the central business district of Waller and is northwest of Houston. It was formerly known as Skylake Airport.

Facilities and aircraft 
Runway 17/35 has a 4,190 x 50 ft (1,277 x 15 m) treated asphalt pavement. Runway N/S has a 3,030 x 53 ft (924 x 16 m) turf surface.

For the 12-month period ending February 24, 1995, the airport had 15,500 general aviation aircraft operations, an average of 42 per day. At that time there were 50 aircraft based at this airport: 88% single-engine, 8% multi-engine, 2% helicopter and 2% glider.

Information as of July 7, 2008: Runway 17/35 is closed, with "X's" marked on the asphalt.  Turf runway is used by all aircraft at this time.  Unicom is 122.9.  There is no fuel or any other aviation businesses at the airport.  It is an aviation community, but there are no known EAA, USUA, ASC or other clubs in operation at Skydive Houston.

References

External links 

 

Airports in Greater Houston
Buildings and structures in Waller County, Texas
Transportation in Waller County, Texas